The Nordgau (from the Germanic for "northern region") can refer to two distinct areas:

 Nordgau (Alsace), the Alsatian Nordgau, the medieval County of Nordgau, the northern part of Alsace
 Margraviate of the Nordgau, the Bavarian Nordgau in the area of the Upper Palatinate

See also
Bavarian B V, a steam locomotive, one surviving example being the Nordgau